Gert Evan Nilsson (7 February 1932 – 9 November 2016) was a Swedish former footballer who played as a forward in Malmö FF.

References 

1932 births
2016 deaths
Association football forwards
Swedish footballers
Allsvenskan players
Malmö FF players
Footballers from Malmö